"In My Daughter's Eyes" is a song written by James T. Slater and recorded by American country music singer Martina McBride. It was released in November 2003 as the second single from McBride's 2003 album Martina.

The song peaked at number 4 on the US Billboard Hot Country Songs chart in 2003 and at number 3 on the Adult Contemporary chart in 2004. It also peaked at number 39 on the Billboard Hot 100.

Chart performance
"In My Daughter's Eyes" debuted at number 54 on the U.S. Billboard Hot Country Singles & Tracks for the week of November 22, 2003.

Year-end charts

Certifications

References

2003 songs
Martina McBride songs
Songs written by James T. Slater
Song recordings produced by Paul Worley
2003 singles
RCA Records Nashville singles
2000s ballads
Country ballads